The Coffee County Courthouse in Manchester, Tennessee is a historic courthouse which was built in 1871.  It was listed on the National Register of Historic Places in 1974.

It was built after the original 1837 courthouse was destroyed by a fire.  It is a brick Italianate-style building, with brick laid in American bond.

References

External links

County courthouses in Tennessee
National Register of Historic Places in Coffee County, Tennessee
Italianate architecture in Tennessee
Government buildings completed in 1871
Manchester, Tennessee